Marmalade Revolution is a 1980 Swedish drama film directed by and starring Erland Josephson. It was entered into the 30th Berlin International Film Festival.

Cast
 Erland Josephson - Karl Henrik Eller
 Bibi Andersson - Anna-Berit
 Marie Göranzon - Maj
 Jan Malmsjö - Edvard
 Charlotta Larsson - Hanna (as Lotta Larsson)
 Ulf Palme - Per Hugo
 Kristina Adolphson - Aina
 Susanna Hellberg - Ellen
 Ingvar Kjellson - Editor
 Meta Velander - Maitre d'
 Börje Ahlstedt - Photographer
 Christina Carlwind - Clerk
 Björn Gustafson - Night Wanderer
 Olof Lundström Orloff - Concierge (as Olof Lundström)

References

External links

1980 films
1980s Swedish-language films
1980 drama films
Films directed by Erland Josephson
Swedish drama films
1980s Swedish films